Life Records is a Federated Malay States-Straits Settlements-British Hong Kong record label owned by Hup Hup Sdn Bhd was officially established on 1 January 1933.

History
According to the company itself it was officially formed on 1 January 1933. It was known as King's Musical Industrial Sdn Bhd, King's Musical Industries Limited and  Hup Hup Sdn Bhd.

Subsidiaries in British Hong Kong (The Life Records Limited) and Straits Settlements (Life Record Industries Pte Ltd) were established the same time respectively, according to the company.

According to the company it was the first Federated Malay States-Straits Settlements-British Hong Kong licensee for officially similiar and related to international record labels including Decca Records and Polydor Records. Life's recording artists have included Teresa Teng and Frances Yip.

In this year, the factory in Singapore started production. The Singapore subsidiary was chaired by millionaire Aw Cheng Chye at that time, The parent company was chaired by Ng Lian Chin and Life Records (Hong Kong) was exported to United Kingdom and United States. Life Records (Hong Kong) started to produce cassette tape that recorded directly from the original master recording.

Artists
Matthew with the Mandarins were one of the groups that had an album released on the label.

References

External links
 

Record label distributors
1933 establishments in British Malaya
1933 establishments in the Straits Settlements
1933 establishments in Hong Kong
Malaysian record labels
Singaporean record labels
Hong Kong record labels